The Faculty is a 1998 American science fiction horror film directed by Robert Rodriguez and written by Kevin Williamson. It stars Jordana Brewster, Clea DuVall, Laura Harris, Josh Hartnett, Shawn Hatosy, Famke Janssen, Piper Laurie, Bebe Neuwirth, Robert Patrick, Usher Raymond, Jon Stewart, and Elijah Wood.

The film was theatrically released on December 25, 1998, by Miramax Films through Dimension Films. It grossed $63.2 million and has developed a cult following since its release, with some critics noting it as underrated in Rodriguez's catalog.

Plot
One evening at Herrington High School in Ohio, teachers and Principal Drake leave after discussing the school's budget. When Drake returns to retrieve her keys, she is attacked by the school's football coach, Joe Willis. Drama teacher Mrs. Olson emotionlessly stabs Drake with scissors as she flees the school.

The following morning, the students arrive, including Casey Connor, the dedicated but perpetually harassed photographer for the school newspaper. Casey is the unappreciated assistant to spiteful Delilah Profitt, the paper's editor-in-chief and head cheerleader. Delilah's mistreated boyfriend Stan Rosado is contemplating quitting the football team to pursue academics. Zeke Tyler is an intelligent yet rebellious student repeating his senior year. Zeke sells, among other illegal items, a powdery ecstasy-like drug he manufactures and distributes. He is confronted by teacher Elizabeth Burke, who expresses concern for him over his illegal activities. Naive transfer student Marybeth Louise Hutchinson befriends self-styled outcast Stokely Mitchell, who has deliberately spread rumors that she is a lesbian though she has a crush on Stan. Marybeth develops a crush on Zeke which is reciprocated.

Casey finds a strange creature on the football field and takes it to science teacher Mr. Furlong, who believes it is a new species of cephalopod-specific parasite called a mesozoan. Delilah and Casey hide in the teachers' lounge to find a story. They witness Coach Willis and Ms. Olson forcing one of the parasites into the ear of the school nurse. They also find the body of another teacher, Mrs. Brummel. Casey and Delilah flee, and Casey calls the police, but his claims are dismissed.

The next day, Casey tells Delilah, Stan, and Stokely he believes the teachers are being controlled by aliens. After Zeke and Marybeth tease them about their theory, Mr. Furlong attempts to infect them. Zeke injects his homemade drugs into Furlong's eye, killing him. Zeke takes the five to his house, where he experiments on a specimen retrieved by Casey. He discovers it needs water to survive and can be killed by his drugs. Zeke makes everyone take his drug to prove they are uninfected. Delilah is revealed as infected and she destroys Zeke's lab and most of his drug supply before escaping.

Acting on Stokely's speculation that killing the alien queen will revert everyone to normal, the group returns to the school, where their football team is playing and infecting opposing players. Believing Principal Drake to be the queen, they isolate her in the gym and fatally shoot her. Stan confronts the coach and team to see if the plan worked, but becomes infected himself. Zeke and Casey retrieve more of Zeke's drugs from his car. Casey leads infected students away from Zeke, who encounters Miss Burke in the parking lot and incapacitates her.

At the gym, Marybeth reveals herself to be the alien queen; earlier on, she faked taking the drug. Casey and Stokely flee to the swimming pool, where Stokely is injured and becomes infected. Zeke and Casey hide in the locker room, where Marybeth reverts to her human disguise. She explains she is taking over Earth because her planet is dying. Marybeth transforms back into her true form and hurls Zeke across the room into the lockers, knocking him out. Casey seizes the drug and traps the queen behind retracting bleachers. He stabs the drug into the queen's eye. Casey returns to the locker room and finds Stokely and Zeke alive.

One month later, everyone returned to normal. Stan and Stokely, who has shed her Goth girl image, are now dating. Zeke has taken Stan's place on the football team, while Miss Burke affectionately watches him practice. Delilah, no longer vindictive, is now dating Casey, who is considered a local hero as various news media reveal the attempted alien invasion is now public knowledge, even as the FBI denies it.

Cast

Production
In 1990, David Wechter and Bruce Kimmel wrote their first draft of the script and sent it out, but there were no buyers. It wasn't until after the success of Scream (1996) that Miramax bought the script and rushed it into production. Bob Weinstein and Harvey Weinstein brought in Kevin Williamson to do rewrites, keeping the basic story, but rewriting the dialogue and adding new characters to make it more "hip". Originally, Williamson was set to direct the film, but he chose not to so he could direct his self-penned script Teaching Mrs. Tingle (1999). The Weinsteins brought in Robert Rodriguez to direct the film instead.

The Faculty takes place in the fictional town of Herrington, Ohio, but was shot in Austin, San Marcos, Dallas, and Lockhart, Texas. In a retrospective interview, Clea Duvall said the making of the film "was so much fun. It was mostly night shoots, so it was like we were in this alternate universe. Working all night long and making this fun sci-fi horror movie. I loved it."

Music

The score is composed by Marco Beltrami, who had previously scored the teen-slasher-horror film, Scream, as well as Mimic (1997). Both Beltrami's score and songs by various artists used in the film were released as albums. The "music from the motion picture" album features songs by various indie and alternative rock groups.

 "Another Brick in the Wall (Part 2)" – Class of '99
 "The Kids Aren't Alright" – The Offspring
 "I'm Eighteen" – Creed
 "Helpless" – D Generation
 "School's Out" – Soul Asylum
 "Medication" – Garbage
 "Haunting Me" – Stabbing Westward
 "Maybe Someday" – Flick
 "Resuscitation" – Sheryl Crow
 "It's Over Now" – Neve
 "Changes" – Shawn Mullins
 "Stay Young" – Oasis
 "Another Brick in the Wall (Part 1)" – Class of '99

Release

Home media
Several scenes involving an additional character named Venus, played by Kidada Jones, were shown in TV previews for the film, as well as in Tommy Hilfiger promotional commercials for the movie, but her scenes were cut from the final film. She is visible in a scene in the theatrical version, standing next to Gabe (Usher) in Mr. Furlong's (Jon Stewart) science class when they are looking at the "new species" in the aquarium.

The Faculty was released in several countries on Blu-ray, including Canada on October 6, 2009, by Alliance; in Australia on September 1, 2011, by Reel; in the United Kingdom on October 3, 2011, by Lionsgate, in Germany on October 6, 2011, by Studio Canal; in France on January 10, 2012, by Studio Canal; and in the United States on July 31, 2012, by Echo Bridge Home Entertainment. Lionsgate re-issued the Blu-ray version in the United States on October 7, 2014 after Echo Bridge lost the rights to the Miramax films. Home media for The Faculty do not include traditional extras provided for other Robert Rodriguez films, such as a "10 Minute Film School" feature, audio commentary, and making-of featurettes.

Reception

Box office 
The Faculty was viewed on 2,365 screens on its opening weekend, debuting at No. 5 in the US and making $11,633,495. Its eventual US gross was $40.3 million. Its debut below commercial expectations has been partly credited to the studio’s decision to release the movie on Christmas Day, a time when audiences are likelier to watch traditional dramas or feel-good fare. In retrospect, Jordana Brewster said:

Critical response
On review aggregator website Rotten Tomatoes, The Faculty holds an approval rating of 55% based on 56 reviews, with an average rating of 5.60/10. The site's critics consensus called the film a "Rip-off of other sci-fi thrillers." On Metacritic, the film has a weighted average score of 61 out of 100 based on 19 critics, indicating "generally favorable reviews." Audiences polled by CinemaScore gave the film an average grade of "B" on an A+ to F scale.

Positive reviews at the time praised Kevin Williamson’s self-aware script and trademark meta humor that included references to iconic science-fiction films. In a review for Variety, Dennis Harvey wrote, "The Faculty works hard at mixing a canny cocktail of cineastic in-jokes, affectionate teenploitation and high-octane suspense that’s as enjoyable as it is impossible to take seriously." Harvey added that Williamson and Robert Rodriguez combine to "make a complete lack of socially redeeming value seem so much fun that 'The Faculty' might well become a pulp classic". Charles Taylor of Salon called the film "subversive" and said "its honest, good-natured junkiness… feels like a relief". He appreciated the film's homages to genre movies including Carrie (1976), Invasion of the Body Snatchers (1978) and Blue Velvet (1986) while also citing the character of Stokely as the standout amongst the teen archetypes.

Michael Sauter of Entertainment Weekly gave the film a grade of B− and expressed a wish that the film had used the faculty characters more. In contrast, Tom Sinclair, also of EW, gave the film a C+ and said Williamson has become "too invested in the earnestness of teen angst to portray it in the scathing parodistic terms a hip horror movie demands". The New York Times gave a mostly negative review but praised the cast. The Austin Chronicle awarded the film 3.5 stars and said, "While it may suffer a bit from excess character clutter (nearly 10 major characters throughout), it's nonetheless a slam-bang, sci-fi actioner, relentlessly paced and edited, with a pounding soundtrack and some ingenious aliens courtesy of Bernie Wrightson and KNB Effects."

Retrospective
In subsequent years, various critics have written about The Faculty impact. Aliya Whiteley wrote, "It's all about examining the tropes of science fiction with a smart, funny angle. Half of the fun in this film is in identifying where you first came across a certain character's name or saw a particular special effect. For instance, there's a brilliant moment with a head on legs that I defy you to watch and not think of a certain John Carpenter film." Whiteley concluded, "The Faculty is very definitely a big mess of a movie. But if you love all things sci-fi, it's a good mess." Keith Phipps described the film as "a Kevin Williamson-scripted high-school variation on Invasion Of The Body Snatchers." Haleigh Foutch considered it one of the most iconic 1990s teen horror films: "Yet another win from 90s teen screenwriter in chief Kevin Williamson, The Faculty fused Williamson's knack for snappy teen drama with Robert Rodriguez's subversive camp to fantastic results. It's smart without ever taking itself too seriously and campy without ever losing its cool, drawing proudly from the tradition of classic alien invasion movies and casting them in the 90s teen tradition."

Analysis
The film has been praised for its portrayal of teenage alienation, especially within the high school environment and its system of cliques and social roles. In particular, the alien invasion through parasitized bodies has been recognized as functioning as a metaphor for those concepts, reflecting the fear of losing one's nascent individuality to a crowd. The alien queen encapsulates this by offering the heroes a world without alienation or differences, in which "everything that is both wonderful and awful about being a teenager is done away in favor of blind allegiance".

Experts also noted in The Faculty a reinvention of the fear of female sexuality often found in the horror genre. The character of Marybeth, the alien queen, is "a complex imbrication of woman, alien and power" that acts beyond the role of femme fatale. She masquerades as a virginal, unassuming girl clad in floral dresses, but at the final battle she reveals her true sexual threat, becoming nude by her alien transformation and turning confident and flirtatious. Her role as a threatening, castrating agent is underlined by the sharp teeth of her species, which evoke a vagina dentata, and their association to water, the archaic, womb-like female element. As the monstrous mother of her race, she tries to seduce the heroes by offering them a symbolic return to the womb. As Sharon Packer and Jody Pennington put it:

The image on the screen is dual: we see the beautiful, young, naked Marybeth strolling around looking for Casey, and the shadow of the monstrous form in the walls. Marybeth delivers a speech which ties the elements of the movie together. It is about the "world" she came from and its promises of "paradise" for lost and lonely humans, trapped in high-school "hell".

The character of Miss Burke precedes Marybeth in the same line, revealing her hidden sexuality only after being infected and turned into a monster. The scene of her detached, tentacled head in particular echoes the Freudian Medusa head. The monstrous feminine is therefore used in the film to reflect the teenage characters entering adult world, where they are forced to "come to terms with female sexuality and overcome their fear of its 'monstrous' aspects in order to become fully functioning adults". Casey, the male character closest to his softer, feminine side, is the final hero of the film.

Accolades
The film was nominated for a total of eight awards, including an ALMA Award for director Robert Rodriguez, 2 Saturn Awards, 2 Blockbuster Entertainment Awards and 3 Teen Choice Awards, but did not win any.

References

Sources

External links

 
 
 
 

1998 films
1998 horror films
1990s science fiction horror films
1990s teen horror films
American body horror films
American high school films
American science fiction horror films
American teen horror films
1990s English-language films
Alien invasions in films
Fiction about parasites
Dimension Films films
Films scored by Marco Beltrami
Films about educators
Films about extraterrestrial life
Films directed by Robert Rodriguez
Films produced by Elizabeth Avellán
Films set in Ohio
Films shot in Austin, Texas
Films shot in Dallas
Films with screenplays by Kevin Williamson
1990s American films